Sir Cornelius Hendricksen Kortright,  (26 December 1817 – 23 December 1897) was a British civil servant who held positions including Governor of British Guiana.

Kortright was baptised on 8 January 1818 at Saint Mary church in London. He was the son of Lawrence and Jane Maria Kortright. He died on 23 December 1897 in Ontario, Canada, three days before his eightieth birthday. Kortright was knighted in 1882. While in Australia, Cornelius Kortright worked for Edmond Morey, and is mentioned in chapters four and five of 'Reminiscences of a pioneer in New South Wales. By Edmond Morey, of Maryborough, Queensland, published in 1907.

 From 1854 until 1857, he was the President of the British Virgin Islands.
 From 1857 until 1864, he was Lieutenant Governor of Grenada.
 From 1864 until 1872, he was Lieutenant Governor of Tobago.

 In 1875 and again from 1876 until 1877, he was the Governor of Sierra Leone.
 From 3 April 1877 until 13 December 1881, he was Governor of British Guiana

Political Summary

==References==

1817 births
1897 deaths
Knights Commander of the Order of St Michael and St George
Presidents of the British Virgin Islands
Governors of British Tobago
Governors of the Gambia
Governors of British Grenada
Governors of Sierra Leone
Governors of British Guiana